Samuel David Fedor (born December 10, 1940) is a retired professional basketball player who spent one season in the National Basketball Association (NBA) as a member of the San Francisco Warriors. He attended Florida State University where his play on the school's basketball team earned him the honor of having his number retired. He was drafted by the Warriors during the third round of the 1962 NBA draft.

References

External links

1940 births
Living people
Basketball players from Florida
Florida State Seminoles men's basketball players
Forwards (basketball)
San Francisco Warriors draft picks
San Francisco Warriors players
American men's basketball players